Da Baydestrian is the third studio album by American rapper Mistah F.A.B. from Oakland, California. It was released on May 15, 2007 via SMC Recordings and Thizz Entertainment. Production was handled by several record producers, including Gennessee Lewis, Maxwell Smart, Sean T, Traxamillion, Rob-E, Bedrock, Politics, Trackademicks, and Young L. It also features guest appearances from Keak da Sneak, Messy Marv, Spice 1, Too $hort, Fabo, 2Dolla, Dogwood, Dyson, and J. Nash.

The album peaked at number 177 on the US Billboard 200 and number 47 on the Top R&B/Hip-Hop Albums chart.

Track listing

Personnel 
 Stanley P. Cox Jr – main artist, executive producer
 Todd Anthony Shaw – featured artist (tracks: 2, 8, 15)
 Charles Toby Bowens – featured artist (tracks: 2, 10)
 Marvin Watson – featured artist (track 6)
 Gennessee Lewis – featured artist (track 9), producer (tracks: 9, 13, 14, 16)
 Robert L. Green, Jr. – featured artist (track 10)
 Lefabian Williams – featured artist (track 15)
 Rob Enea – producer (tracks: 1, 3, 7, 11, 12, 17)
 Sultan Banks – producer (track 2)
 Max Perry – producer (track 4)
 Jason Valerio – producer (track 5)
 Sean Miguel Thompson – producer (track 6)
 Joseph Epperson – producer (track 8)
 Lloyd Omadhebo – producer (track 15)
 Michael Denten – mixing & mastering
 Deegan Mack Adams – mixing
 Desrie Jeffery – executive producer
 Monte "Mont Rock" Malone – production coordinator
 Vivian Chen – photography
 Dow Jones – A&R
 Will Bronson – A&R

Charts

References

External links

2007 albums
Mistah F.A.B. albums
SMC Recordings albums
Thizz Entertainment albums
Albums produced by Maxwell Smart (record producer)